Bagger Dave's Burger Tavern Inc. is an American restaurant chain that was founded in Michigan in 2008.

History

Bagger Dave's was established in 2008, in Berkley, Michigan, by Michael Ansley, who is also the current CEO of the restaurant chain.

Since its founding in 2008, Bagger Dave's had opened restaurants in 26 locations: 17 in Michigan, and 9 in Indiana. On December 28, 2015, Bagger Dave's announced they would be closing eight underperforming locations. One in Downtown Detroit and seven in Indiana. In 2016, the company was spun off from Diversified Restaurant Holdings, and additional closures in 2017 and 2018 leave the chain with just 10 remaining locations.

References

Regional restaurant chains in the United States
Restaurants in Michigan
Restaurants in Indiana
2008 establishments in Michigan
Restaurants established in 2008
Oakland County, Michigan